Hoyt is a small unincorporated community in Morgan County, Colorado, United States. The community was named after James A. Hoyt, an early settler.

A post office at Hoyt had been in operation since 1906.  The U.S. Post Office at Wiggins (ZIP Code 80654) now serves Hoyt postal addresses.

Geography
Hoyt is located at  (40.015520,-104.075375).

References

Unincorporated communities in Morgan County, Colorado
Unincorporated communities in Colorado